The Communist Party’s Institute for Basic Problems of Marxism-Leninism  was a Marxist think tank of the Polish United Workers' Party, existing from 1974 to 1984. In 1984 it was transformed into the Academy of Social Sciences (Akademia Nauk Społecznych).

1974 establishments in Poland
Marxist organizations